The 1998 Mercedes-Benz Cup was a men's tennis tournament played on Hard in Los Angeles, United States that was part of the World Series of the 1998 ATP Tour. It was the seventy-first edition of the tournament and was held from 27 July – 2 August 1998. Fifth-seeded Andre Agassi won the singles title and the accompanying $45,000 first-prize money.

Finals

Singles

 Andre Agassi defeated  Tim Henman, 6–4, 6–4
 It was Agassi's 4th singles title of the year and the 38th of his career

Doubles

 Patrick Rafter /  Sandon Stolle defeated  Jeff Tarango /  Daniel Vacek 6–4, 6–4

References

External links
 ITF tournament edition details

Mercedes-Benz Cup
Los Angeles Open (tennis)
Mercedes-Benz Cup
Mercedes-Benz Cup
Mercedes-Benz Cup
Mercedes-Benz Cup